Milton is a 1976 album by Milton Nascimento.

Reception

The album was reviewed by Terri Hinte for Allmusic who wrote that the album was "a remarkably cohesive piece of work that stands as one of his finest".

Track listing
 "Raça (Hasa) (Race)" (Fernando Brant, Milton Nascimento) – 3:35
 "Fairy Tale Song (Cadê)" (Matthew Moore, Nascimento, Ruy Guerra) – 4:11
 "Francisco" (Nascimento) – 4:27
 "Nothing Will Be As It Was (Nada Será Como Antes)" (Nascimento, Rene Vincent, Ronaldo Bastos) – 3:53
 "Cravo E Canela (Clove and Cinnamon)" (Nascimento, Bastos) – 3:44
 "The Call (Chamada)" (Nascimento, Bastos) – 5:49
 "One Coin (Tostão)" (Matthew Moore Nascimento) – 5:30
 "Saídas E Bandeiras (Exits and Flags)" (Brant, Nascimento) – 4:45
 "Os Povos (The People)" (Borges, Nascimento) – 8:06

Personnel
Milton Nascimento – guitar, vocals, arranger
Toninho Horta – electric guitar
Wayne Shorter – soprano saxophone, tenor saxophone
Raul De Souza – trombone
Herbie Hancock – piano
Hugo Fattoruso – piano, electric organ
Novelli – double bass
Roberto Silva – drums, percussion
Laudir De Oliveira – percussion
Production
Bernie Grundman – mastering
Jeremy Zatkin – engineer
Roland Young – art direction
Phil Shima – design
Rob Fraboni – producer
CAFI – photography

References

External links
 

1976 albums
A&M Records albums
Albums produced by Rob Fraboni
Milton Nascimento albums
Portuguese-language albums
Albums recorded at Shangri-La (recording studio)